Menthor Editor is a no longer maintained free ontology engineering tool for dealing with OntoUML models. It included OntoUML syntax validation, Alloy simulation, Anti-Pattern verification, and MDA transformations from OntoUML to OWL, SBVR and Natural Language (Brazilian Portuguese).

Menthor Editor emerged from the OLED editor, developed at the Ontology & Conceptual Modeling Research Group (NEMO) located at the Federal University of Espírito Santo (UFES) in Vitória city, state of Espírito Santo, Brazil.

Menthor Editor was developed by Menthor using Java, was available in English, and was a multiplatform software being compatible with Windows, Linux and OS X.

The developer's of Menthor Editor reported in 2000 that it is no longer maintained and that it has been replaced by the OntoUML Plugin for Visual Paradigm, informing that features of the Menthor Editor will gradually be migrated to this new solution.

References

External links 

UML tools
Diagramming software
Software development
Data modeling languages
Systems Modeling Language
Software modeling language